XLT may refer to:
                      
 Xlt (file format), a Microsoft Excel template file
 XLT agar, a culture medium used to isolate salmonellae from samples
 X linked thrombocytopenia, an inherited blood clotting disorder
 Litecoin, a crypto-currency
 A mid-range trim level for Ford trucks and sport utility vehicles, including the Ford Ranger

See also
 XLT86